Waimakariri is a New Zealand parliamentary electorate, formed for the  and returning one Member of Parliament to the New Zealand House of Representatives. The MP for Waimakariri is Matt Doocey of the National Party.

Population areas
Waimakariri centres on metropolitan Christchurch and spreads northward up the coast of the South Island. From Christchurch it contains the suburbs of Casebrook and Belfast; from Waimakariri District to its north, it takes in the towns of Kaiapoi and Rangiora as well as a selection of small inland localities such as Cust and Oxford. Boundary changes following the 2006 census were relatively minor; Waimakariri managed to avoid the upheaval wrought upon electorates in Christchurch, losing Bishopdale to Ilam and the last remaining segment of Papanui to Christchurch Central.

Along with neighbouring Selwyn, Waimakariri has been experiencing strong population growth, with many people from Christchurch displaced by the earthquakes. In the 2013/14 boundary review by the Representation Commission, Waimakariri lost most of Redwood and Marshland to Christchurch Central and Christchurch East respectively, while it gained the less populated Harewood north of Sawyers Arms Road from Selwyn.

History

The existence of Waimakariri dates back to the introduction of MMP voting in the 1996 general election, when the number of South Island electorates fell from twenty-five to sixteen. The electorate originates in the old Rangiora electorate, with Hurunui District shorn off and placed in Kaikōura, and the resultant electorate pulled into Christchurch via State Highway 71, absorbing parts of Christchurch previously in the electorate of Christchurch North. The first contest saw Rangiora's Jim Gerard easily defeated by former Prime Minister and MP for Christchurch North, Mike Moore.  He left the office in July 1999, having been elected Director-General of the World Trade Organization.

Clayton Cosgrove won the second contest in 1999 and was confirmed in 2002, 2005 and 2008.

Given that Rangiora was a safe National electorate and Christchurch North a safe Labour electorate, and given the urban-rural makeup of the electorate, Waimakariri does not favour any party. At the 2005 election, while Waimakariri's electors were returning incumbent Clayton Cosgrove by 5,064 votes (and in the process slashing his majority in half), their party vote intentions were more ambiguous, with National winning 79 more party votes than Labour, setting Waimakariri up to be a key electorate at the 2008 election. Cosgrove retained the electorate with a much narrower 390 majority in 2008, whilst his opponent Kate Wilkinson's party (National) got over 5000 more party votes.

Results from the  gave Wilkinson a lead of 642 votes over Cosgrove, shifting the electorate from marginal Labour to marginal National. Doocey beat Cosgrove with an increased majority.

Members of Parliament
Key

List MPs
Members of Parliament elected from party lists in elections where that person also unsuccessfully contested the Waimakariri electorate. Unless otherwise stated, all MPs terms began and ended at general elections.

1Jim Gerard retired in April 1997 to take appointment as High Commissioner to Canada
2Rosewarne entered Parliament on 25 July 2022, following the resignation of Kris Faafoi.

Election results

2020 election

2017 election

2014 election

2011 election

Electorate (as at 26 November 2011): 47,387

2008 election

2005 election

1999 election
Refer to Candidates in the New Zealand general election 1999 by electorate#Waimakariri for a list of candidates.

Table footnotes

References

External links
Electorate Profile  Parliamentary Library

New Zealand electorates
Politics of Canterbury, New Zealand
1996 establishments in New Zealand
Waimakariri District